Cumeeira is a parish in Penela Municipality, Portugal.  The population in 2011 was 1,072, in an area of 21.29 km².

References

Freguesias of Penela